Michael Antony Eagar (20 March 1934 – 24 August 2019) was an English first-class cricketer. He played for Oxford University and Gloucestershire between 1956 and 1961.

Mike Eagar was educated at Rugby School and Worcester College, Oxford. His highest first-class score was 125 against Free Foresters in 1956 in his third first-class match. 

He became a teacher at Eton College. His death was reported in The Times in August 2019.

References

External links

1934 births
2019 deaths
English cricketers
Gloucestershire cricketers
Sportspeople from Kensington
Cricketers from Greater London
Oxford University cricketers
Marylebone Cricket Club cricketers
People educated at Rugby School
Alumni of Worcester College, Oxford